Brdo is a settlement in the Municipality of Slovenske Konjice in eastern Slovenia. Traditionally the entire area around Slovenske Konjice was part of Styria.  It is now included in the Savinja Statistical Region.

References

External links
Brdo at Geopedia

Populated places in the Municipality of Slovenske Konjice